Tyson Heung (born May 17, 1979 in Brampton, Ontario, Canada) is a German speed skater. He competed at the 2006 Winter Olympics in Turin. He represented Germany at the 2010 Winter Olympics in Vancouver . He finished 5th in the 500m event. He was the winner of the 500m world cup title for the 2006–2007 season. His mother was born in Germany.

Heung is a graduate of McGill University.

References

1979 births
Living people
German male short track speed skaters
Olympic short track speed skaters of Germany
Short track speed skaters at the 2006 Winter Olympics
Short track speed skaters at the 2010 Winter Olympics
World Short Track Speed Skating Championships medalists
Sportspeople from Ontario
Sportspeople from Brampton
Canadian people of German descent
Canadian schoolteachers
McGill University alumni